Bolama may refer to several locations in Guinea-Bissau:

 Bolama Region
 Bolama Island
 Bolama (town), capital of the region and main town of the island